HM Motor Gun Boat 501 was a motor gunboat operated by Royal Navy Coastal Forces during the Second World War. The design, prepared by Bill Holt of the DNC's Boat Section, was unusual for a British light coastal forces' boat at the time in that it was of composite construction, whereas most MTBs and Motor Launches were entirely wooden-hulled. MGB 501's frames and various internal members were steel, with layers of diagonal wooden planking forming the exterior skin of the hull and wood for the remaining decks & bulkheads.

She was initially designed as a combined anti-submarine boat and motor torpedo boat,but was completed as a Motor Gun Boat. Based on the lessons of combat experience with the early MA/SBs following their conversion to MGBs, MGB 501's initial designed gun armament, which would have included a 2-pdr Rolls gun, was replaced with a suite that would have provided greater reliability and volume of fire in battle (a Vickers pom-pom and an Oerlikon cannon). Retaining her 21-inch torpedo tubes, she therefore completed for service as a combined motor gun & torpedo boat (much like the 'E' boats or schnellboote) whilst being designated purely as an MGB.

Loss
HM MGB 501 was lost off Land's End on 27 July 1942, after an internal explosion.

Notes

 Gardiner, Robert and Chesneau, Roger, Conway's All the World's Fighting Ships 1922–1946, Conway Maritime Press, 1980. .

Gunboats of the Royal Navy
World War II shipwrecks in the Atlantic Ocean
Ships built in England
1942 ships
Maritime incidents in July 1942